Crenshaw, or the Crenshaw District, is a neighborhood in South Los Angeles, California.

In the post–World War II era, a Japanese American community was established in Crenshaw. African Americans started migrating to the district in the mid 1960s, and by the early 1970s were the majority.

The Crenshaw Boulevard commercial corridor has had many different cultural backgrounds throughout the years,  but it is still "the heart of African American commerce in Los Angeles".

Geography
According to Google Maps, the Crenshaw neighborhood is centered on Crenshaw Boulevard and Buckingham Road.  The neighborhood of Baldwin Hills is to the south, Baldwin Village is to the west, Leimert Park is to the east and West Adams to the north.

Cartographer Eric Brightwell considers Baldwin Village to be part of Crenshaw. Google Maps includes in Crenshaw areas labelled by Brightwell as being Baldwin Hill Estates, Baldwin Hill, Baldwin Village, and southern parts of West Adams and Jefferson Park. Google Maps plots Crenshaw as bounded by Crenshaw Boulevard, Stocker Street, and South La Brea Avenue, with the border going along West Jefferson Boulevard to Vineyard Ave, northeast to West 30th Street, east to 11th Avenue, south and west along West Exposition Boulevard.

Demographics

In the post-World War II era, a Japanese-American community was established in Crenshaw. There was an area Japanese school called Dai-Ichi Gakuen. Due to a shared sense of discrimination, many Japanese-Americans had formed close relationships with the African-American community.

At its peak, it was one of the largest Japanese-American settlements in California, with about 8,000 residents around 1970, and Dai-Ichi Gakuen had a peak of 700 students.

Beginning in the 1970s the Japanese American community began decreasing in size and Japanese-American businesses began leaving. Scott Shibya Brown stated that "some say" the effect was a "belated response" to the 1965 Watts riots and that "several residents say a wave of anti-Japanese-American sentiment began cropping up in the area, prompting further departures." Eighty-two-year-old Jimmy Jike was quoted in the Los Angeles Times in 1993, stating that it was mainly because the residents' children, after attending universities, moved away. 

By 1980, there were 4,000 Japanese ethnic residents, half of the previous size. By 1990 there were 2,500 Japanese-Americans, mostly older residents. By 1993, the community was diminishing in size, with older Japanese Americans staying but with younger ones moving away. That year, Dai-Ichi Gakuen had 15 students. In the 90s there began a shift to a new generation of Japanese Americans moving back into the neighborhood.

Government

Emergency service
The Los Angeles Police Department is responsible for law enforcement in the area. The Southwest Community police station is at 1546 W. Martin Luther King Jr. Boulevard.

The Los Angeles Fire Department operates one main fire station, Station 94 - in the area.

Post office
The United States Postal Service operates the Crenshaw Post Office, the Julian Dixon Post Office and the North Torrance Post Office.

Education
Public schools are operated by the Los Angeles Unified School District (LAUSD).

Schools
 Crenshaw High School, which is south of Martin Luther King Jr. Boulevard and east of Crenshaw Boulevard, is the local public high school.
 Susan Miller Dorsey High School

The district's charter schools in the area include the KIPP network. KIPP Academy of Opportunity
Celerity Nascent Charter School 
the New Design Charter School (built in 2004)
View Park Preparatory High School
View Park Preparatory Middle School.

Neighborhood

Crenshaw is a largely residential neighborhood  of single-story houses, bungalows and low-rise condominiums and apartments. There are also commercial buildings with an industrial corridor along Jefferson Boulevard. There are also several other commercial districts throughout the neighborhood.

After courts ruled segregation covenants to be unconstitutional, the area opened up to other races. A large Japanese American settlement ensued, which can still be found along Coliseum Street, east and west of Crenshaw Boulevard.  African Americans started migrating to the district in the mid 1960s, and by the early 1970s later were the majority.

In the 1970s, Crenshaw, Leimert Park and neighboring areas together had formed one of the largest African-American communities in the western United States. Crenshaw had suffered significant damage from both the 1992 Los Angeles riots and the 1994 Northridge earthquake but was able to rebound in the late 2000s with the help of redevelopment and gentrification.

In 2006, the population of Crenshaw was around 27,600. Currently, there is  a huge demographic shift increase in which many middle and lower-class blacks and Latinos are migrating to cities in the Inland Empire as well as cities in the Antelope Valley sections of Southern California as a form of gentrification. The gentrification process continues into 2010's as the Crenshaw mall been approved for a major renovation plan, that will include apartments, shops, and more restaurants.

Transportation
The K Line, known as the Crenshaw/LAX Line during planning and construction, is an  light rail line that will "add eight new stations serving the Crenshaw neighborhood, Leimert Park, Inglewood, Westchester and surrounding areas".

The line will run between the Expo/Crenshaw station and Aviation/96 Street station, transiting generally north-south along Crenshaw Boulevard.

Notable places

 

Baldwin Hills Crenshaw Plaza shopping mall is a landmark. It was home to a tri-level Wal-Mart (formerly a Broadway department store, then later a JJ Newberry's), Sears and Macy's. Additional retail stores later were purchased by the mall such as Victoria's Secret, Forever 21, and Ashley Stewart, as well as office supply stores such as Staples.
Marlton Square (formerly known as Santa Barbara Plaza) was a shopping center. The center had aged over the years and was a failed redevelopment project. Local city business developers and Kaiser Permanente purchased the land and demolished the old retail stores in 2011. A new Kaiser Permanente medical office building was built on the site.
The Crenshaw Square Shopping Centre and sign, a local landmark, had been in some disrepair throughout the years. In 2007, the sign was replaced by a modern illuminated red-and-green sign. The Crenshaw Square outdoor shopping center was sold in 2015 and underwent a significant renovation in 2016.
The West Angeles Church of God in Christ, a Pentecostal church near the intersection of Crenshaw and Exposition boulevards, is home to Bishop Charles E. Blake.

Los Angeles Historic-Cultural Monuments
Village Green is a neighborhood near Baldwin Hills.  It is Los Angeles Historic-Cultural Monument #174.
The Holiday Bowl was a bowling alley and café known for being a center of ethnic diversity during the 1960s and 1970s. It featured a sushi bar known as the Sakiba Lounge with live musical acts. Its historic Modernist Googie architecture style has been refurbished by the buildings new  tenants, Starbucks and Walgreens, along with a newly outdoor shopping center that opened in early 2006. It is City of Los Angeles Historic Cultural Monument #688.

Media

Motion picture
John Singleton's 1991 film Boyz n the Hood is a story set in Crenshaw. It was filmed in the Crenshaw neighborhood and other South Central (as it was called then; now called South Los Angeles) Los Angeles locations. It was Singleton's directorial debut and received Oscar nominations for Best Director and Best Original Screenplay at the 64th Academy Awards.

Literature
The novel Southland, by Nina Revoyr, is set in the Crenshaw neighborhood.

Television
The UPN show Moesha is mostly set in Crenshaw, as that's where the main character lives.

The CW show All American is half-set in Crenshaw, as it is the main character's hometown.

Special events
 The annual Kingdom Day Parade: Celebrating Martin Luther King Jr., the Parade held its 35th edition in 2018. It is usually broadcast in the LA area on KABC-TV. The parade goes west on Martin Luther King Jr. Boulevard to Crenshaw Boulevard.
The Taste of Soul Festival takes place every October (since 2005).

Notable people

Tom Bradley, former mayor of Los Angeles
Darwin Cook, National Basketball Association  

Spencer Paysinger, National Football League 

Baron Davis, National Basketball Association
Eric Davis, Major League Baseball
Richard Elfman and Danny Elfman, musicians
Tremaine Fowlkes, National Basketball Association
James Hahn, former mayor of Los Angeles
Kenneth Hahn, (1920–1997)  Los Angeles County Board of Supervisors
Nipsey Hussle, (1985-2019) rapper, entrepreneur, community activist
Ice-T, musician and actor
DeSean Jackson, National Football League
Dom Kennedy, rapper
Kurupt, rapper 
Arthur Lee, singer
Lords of Lyrics, rap group
Skee-Lo, rapper
Darryl Strawberry, Major League Baseball
Syd, singer and producer
De'Anthony Thomas, National Football League
Pam Ward, novelist
David Fulcher, National Football League
Tiffany Haddish, Comedian and Actress
Ice Cube, Rapper
Peter Ramsey, film director

See also 

 List of districts and neighborhoods of Los Angeles
 Crenshaw Boulevard

Notes

References

External links

Articles about the Crenshaw district in the Los Angeles Times.

 
Neighborhoods in Los Angeles
African-American history in Los Angeles
Japanese-American culture in Los Angeles
1904 establishments in California
South Los Angeles